Joseph Maxwell  Kasch (born December 6, 1985) is an American actor and musician. He played "Zig-Zag" in Holes (2003), T-Dog in Waiting... (2005), and Troy in Shrooms (2007).

Early life
Kasch was born in Santa Monica, California, the son of Jody and Taylor Kasch. He is of Scottish descent. He has three full siblings (one sister and two brothers), Quinby, Dylan and Cody Kasch. He grew up in Ojai, California.

Filmography

Film

Television

Stage

References

External links

1985 births
Male actors from California
American male film actors
American people of Scottish descent
Living people
People from Greater Los Angeles
People from Santa Monica, California
People from Ojai, California